Fulwin may refer to:

 Chery Fulwin, a 1999–2006 Chinese subcompact sedan
 Chery Fulwin 2, a 2009–2019 Chinese subcompact car
 DFSK C-Series, a 2009-present Chinese mini truck/van series, truck variant sold in Taiwan as DFSK Gold Fulwin and Grand Fulwin
 DFSK K-Series, a 2005–present Chinese mini truck/van series, truck variant sold in Taiwan as DFSK Fulwin